The National Basketball Association All-Star Weekend is a weekend festival held every February during the middle of the NBA regular season that consists of a variety of basketball events, exhibitions and performances culminating in the NBA All-Star Game held on Sunday night. No regular season games are held during this period, which is also known as the All-Star break. It is right after the trade deadline.

The All-Star Game

The All-Star Game, held on Sunday, is the main event of the weekend. The game showcases a mix of the league's star players, who are drafted by the two players with the most votes. Each team consists of 12 players, making it 24 in total. It is the featured event of NBA All-Star Weekend. NBA All-Star Weekend is a three-day event which goes from Friday to Sunday. The All-Star Game was first played at the Boston Garden on March 2, 1951.

The starting lineup for each squad is selected by a combination of fan, player, and media voting, while the reserves are chosen by a vote among the head coaches from each squad's respective conference. Coaches are not allowed to vote for their own players. If a selected player is injured and cannot participate, the NBA commissioner selects a replacement. The vote leaders for each conferences are assigned as captains and can choose from a pool of players named as all-stars to form their teams. The newly formed teams will also play for a charity of choice to help the games remain competitive. On January 25, 2018, LeBron James and Stephen Curry became the first players to form their own teams according to the new selection format for the 2018 All-Star Game.

The 2017 game was held at Smoothie King Center in New Orleans, LA, home of the New Orleans Pelicans. The 2018 NBA All-Star Game was held at Staples Center in Los Angeles, CA, home of the Los Angeles Lakers and Los Angeles Clippers. The 2019 NBA All-Star Game was held at Spectrum Center in Charlotte, NC, home of the Charlotte Hornets. The 2020 NBA All-Star Game was hosted by The United Center in Chicago, IL, home of the Chicago Bulls. The 2021 NBA All-Star Game was played at the State Farm Arena, Atlanta, GA, home of the Atlanta Hawks. The 2022 NBA All-Star was held at Vivint Arena, Salt Lake City, Utah, home of the Utah Jazz.

Events of All-Star Weekend

The NBA Jam Session, a "theme park of basketball", has been a part of the All-Star festivities since 1993, with fans able to take part in numerous interactive basketball related activities from Thursday through Monday. The NBA Jam Session is usually targeted to young fans

Friday
NBA All-Star Celebrity Game: First held in 2003, the game features retired NBA players, WNBA players, actors, musicians, and athletes from sports other than basketball.
Rising Stars Challenge: From 1994 until 1999, the event was called the "Rookie Game," and composed entirely of first-year players. From 2000 through 2011, the game, renamed the "Rookie Challenge", featured a team of first-year players ('Rookies') against a team of second-year players ('Sophomores'). The 2012 game debuted a new name, the "Rising Stars Challenge", and a new format. While the game continued to feature first- and second-year players, the participants were assigned to teams in a "fantasy draft" by two honorary captains (Charles Barkley and Shaquille O'Neal in 2012 and 2013, Grant Hill and Chris Webber in 2014). In 2015, the Rising Stars Challenge format was switched again to a USA vs the World format. In 2022, the format was changed yet again, as a mini tournament of 4 teams drafted by honorary captains (Rick Barry, Gary Payton, Isiah Thomas, and James Worthy) and included prospects from the NBA G League.
G League Dream Factory Friday Night: First held in 2008, the events includes a slam dunk contest and a three-point shootout. These events were modeled after the NBA All-Star Saturday Night events.

Saturday
G League All-Star Game: First held in 2007, this game features the best players from the NBA G League. The first winner was the East by a score of 114–100. The G League All-Star game was not held in the same arena as all the other All-Star Saturday activities. Instead, it was held on NBA Jam Session's practice court. 
Slam Dunk Contest: This competition showcases the creativity and athletic ability of some of the league's best and youngest dunkers. The specific rules of the contest are decided each year, but the competition is always judged subjectively. After each dunk, or attempted dunk, competitors are awarded a mark out of 10 from five judges, giving a possible high score of 50. The usual rules of 'traveling' and double dribbling do not apply. The most recent winner is Mac McClung of the Philadelphia 76ers.
Three-Point Contest: The league's best three point shooters shoot five basketballs from five different spots around the three-point line. Each shot is worth one point except the last ball of each rack (informally called 'money balls'), which is worth two points. The highest score available in one round has been 34 points since 2014, when the format changed so that in addition to the last ball of every rack, one of the five racks would contain entirely money balls. In 2020, two Mountain Dew shots from further away, worth three points each, were added, bringing the maximum score to 40. The shooters have 70 seconds to shoot the basketballs. The most recent winner is Damian Lillard of the Portland Trail Blazers.
Skills Challenge: Making its debut in 2003, the Skills Challenge pits selected players in a timed obstacle course of dribbling, shooting and passing. Agility, quickness and accuracy all come into play. The most recent winners were Jordan Clarkson, Walker Kessler, and Collin Sexton of the Utah Jazz in 2023.

Sunday
NBA All-Star Game

Former events
Clorox Clutch Challenge: Held in 2022 to honor the NBA's 75th season. Tyrese Haliburton of the Indiana Pacers and Desmond Bane of the Memphis Grizzlies were winners of the 2022 event.
H–O–R–S–E Competition: Held from 2009-2010 and in 2020. In 2020, due to the suspension of the NBA season because of the COVID-19 pandemic, the NBA produced a televised event in which NBA and WNBA players participated in a virtual H–O–R–S–E competition while quarantining at their respective homes. The NBA raised $200,000 for charities while Mike Conley Jr. of the Utah Jazz won the first virtual competition, edging the Chicago Bulls' Zach LaVine.
Shooting Stars Competition: Held from 2004-2015
Legends Classic: Held from 1984 to 1993, the Classic was a game featuring retired NBA players. As in the All-Star Game, the teams were designated East and West. The Legends game opened the Saturday program. The NBA canceled the Legends Classic after 1994 due to the players' frequent injuries from the game, perhaps due to the large range in fitness levels among younger and older alumni.  The Rising Stars Challenge is its replacement.
2Ball Contest: Held in 1998, and through 2000-2001
Hoop-it-up All Star Tournament: Held from 2002-2003
Read To Achieve - Held from 2002-04
Team-Up Celebration - Held from 1997–98, 2000–01
Stay In School Celebration - Held from 1994-95
NBA All-Star Stay In School Jam: Held from 1991-93
Old-Timers Game: Held in 1957 and 1964
FIT Youth Celebration

References

External links
NBA All-Star Game at nba.com
NBA All-Star Weekend at nba.com

Weekend